Hirtaeschopalaea dorsana is a species of beetle in the family Cerambycidae. It was described by Holzschuh in 1999.

References

Lamiinae
Beetles described in 1999